Oklahoma City, like most other major cities, has a diversity of institutions for learning and educational enrichment. Several colleges and universities offer associate and bachelor's degrees and the state's teaching hospital, the University of Oklahoma Medical Center is located east of downtown.

There are also a number of small private colleges and universities in the city, including Oklahoma Christian University, Southern Nazarene University, University of Phoenix - Oklahoma City Campus, Mid-America Christian University, American Christian College and Seminary, Metropolitan College, and the Downtown College Consortium in downtown Oklahoma City.

The most recent nationally accredited private technical school is Oklahoma Technology Institute.  A nonprofit vocation training center for individuals with disabilities in Oklahoma City is Dale Rogers Training Center.

Higher education

The city is home to Oklahoma City University, the University of Oklahoma College of Medicine, Oklahoma State University - Oklahoma City, Oklahoma City Community College, and Langston University. In addition, the University of Oklahoma is located in the city's southern suburb, Norman, the University of Central Oklahoma is located in the northern suburb of Edmond, Rose State College is located in suburban Midwest City, and the Southern Nazarene University is located in suburban Bethany.

Primary and secondary
The Oklahoma City Public Schools is the second-largest district in the state and is one of the few urban districts in the nation with a growing enrollment, due largely to the so-called MAPS for KIDs citywide improvement plan. The Oklahoma School of Science and Mathematics is also in Oklahoma city and is home to the most gifted of the state's math and science pupils.  Additionally, Classen School of Advanced Studies is an Oklahoma City magnet school that hosts students (by application only) talented in the arts. Classen also hosts an IB program, and is ranked 49th in the Nation by Newsweek on its list of top high schools.

Numerous suburban districts circle the urban OCPS district, such as Putnam City Public Schools in suburban northwest Oklahoma City, the largest suburban school district in the state. Also, the city has very well developed private, independent, and parochial schools, including Casady School near posh suburban Nichols Hills and the schools of the Roman Catholic Archdiocese of Oklahoma City.

CareerTech
Oklahoma City has several public career and technology education schools associated with the Oklahoma Department of Career and Technology Education, the largest of which are Metro Technology Center and Francis Tuttle Technology Center.

References